Zaebos is a demon or spirit in the Dictionnaire Infernal. Zaebos is said to be the Grand Count of the infernal realms, and appears in the shape of a handsome soldier mounted on a crocodile.

References

External links 
 www.deliriumsrealm.com

Demons